Barilla (or Barillà) is an Italian surname. Notable people with this surname include:

 Antonino Barillà (born 1988), Italian football central midfielder 
 Antonino Barillà (born 1987),Italian sports shooter

Italian-language surnames